Pasiyahi Kala is a village in Ram Nagar Block in Jaunpur District of Uttar Pradesh state, India. It belongs to Varanasi Division. The Postal Head office Jalalpur and B.o Pasiyahi Khurd.

Gram Pradhan = Usha Yadav

Former Gram Pradhan = Late Mata Prasad Yadav

Late Birabal Yadav

Vinod Kumar Yadav

Neera Yadav 

Rajesh Kumar Yadav

References

Villages in Jaunpur district

Notable Person = Vinod Kumar Yadav

(Guddu Pradhan)